The 2003 GP Miguel Induráin was the 50th edition of the GP Miguel Induráin cycle race and was held on 5 April 2003. The race was won by Matthias Kessler.

General classification

References

2003
2003 in Spanish road cycling